Elections to Rugby Borough Council were held on 10 June 2004.  One third of the council seats were up for election and the council stayed under no overall control.  The number of councillors for each party after the election were Conservative 21, Labour 14, Liberal Democrat 10 and Independent 3.

Election result

|}

Ward results

References

2004 English local elections
2004
2000s in Warwickshire